Joseph Martin Hergert (June 7, 1936 – January 16, 2016) was an American college and professional football player who was a linebacker and placekicker in the American Football League (AFL) for two seasons during the early 1960s.  Hergert played college football for the University of Florida, and thereafter, he played professionally for the Buffalo Bills of the AFL.

Early years
Hergert was born in Wilkes-Barre, Pennsylvania.  He attended Mainland High School in Daytona Beach, Florida, and played high school football for the Mainland Buccaneers.

College career
Hergert attended the University of Florida in Gainesville, Florida, where he played for coach Bob Woodruff's Florida Gators football team from 1956 to 1958.  During his three seasons as a Gator, he played multiple positions, including center, fullback, linebacker and placekicker.

Professional career
The Green Bay Packers of the National Football League (NFL) selected Hergert in the 24th round (277th pick overall) of the 1959 NFL Draft, but he did not play during the  season.  He played for the AFL's Buffalo Bills in 1960 and 1961.

See also

 List of Florida Gators in the NFL Draft

References

Bibliography
 Carlson, Norm, University of Florida Football Vault: The History of the Florida Gators, Whitman Publishing, LLC, Atlanta, Georgia (2007).  .
 Golenbock, Peter, Go Gators!  An Oral History of Florida's Pursuit of Gridiron Glory, Legends Publishing, LLC, St. Petersburg, Florida (2002).  .
 Hairston, Jack, Tales from the Gator Swamp: A Collection of the Greatest Gator Stories Ever Told, Sports Publishing, LLC, Champaign, Illinois (2002).  .
 McCarthy, Kevin M.,  Fightin' Gators: A History of University of Florida Football, Arcadia Publishing, Mount Pleasant, South Carolina (2000).  .
 McEwen, Tom, The Gators: A Story of Florida Football, The Strode Publishers, Huntsville, Alabama (1974).  .
 Nash, Noel, ed., The Gainesville Sun Presents The Greatest Moments in Florida Gators Football, Sports Publishing, Inc., Champaign, Illinois (1998).  .

1936 births
2016 deaths
Sportspeople from Wilkes-Barre, Pennsylvania
Players of American football from Pennsylvania
American football linebackers
Florida Gators football players
Buffalo Bills players
American Football League players